Stephen Jones was a member of the Wisconsin State Assembly during the 1848 session. Jones represented Dodge County, Wisconsin. He was a Whig.

References

Wisconsin Whigs
Members of the Wisconsin State Assembly
19th-century American politicians
People from Dodge County, Wisconsin

Year of birth missing

Year of death missing